Eugoa corniculata is a moth of the family Erebidae. It was described by Lars Kühne in 2007. It is found in Kenya.

References

 

Endemic moths of Kenya
corniculata
Moths described in 2007